{{Infobox automobile
| name = Ford Falcon (FG)
| image = 2009-2010 Ford FG G6 Limited Edition sedan 01.jpg
| caption = Ford Falcon G6 Limited Edition
| manufacturer = Ford Australia
| production = February 2008–October 2014
| assembly = Broadmeadows
| predecessor = Ford Falcon (BF)
| successor = Ford Falcon (FG X)
| class = Full-size
| body_style = 4-door sedan2-door coupé utility2-door cab chassis utility
| platform = E8
| layout = FR layout
| engine = Inline-four
 2.0 L Ecoboost (2012–2014)Straight-six
 4.0 L Barra 4.0 L Barra E-Gas (2008–2011) 4.0 L Barra EcoLPi (2011–2014) 4.0 L Barra TurboV8
 5.4 L BOSS 5.0 L Supercharged BOSS| transmission = 4-speed M93LE automatic (E-Gas)5-speed 5R55S automatic (I6)6-speed 6HP21 automatic (I4)6-speed 6HP26 automatic (I6, V8)6-speed TR-6060 manual
| wheelbase = 
| length =  (XT)
| width = 
| height = 
| weight =  (XT)
}}

The Ford Falcon (FG) is a full-sized car that was produced by Ford Australia from 2008 to 2014. It was the first iteration of the seventh and last generation of the Falcon. Its range no longer featured the Fairmont luxury badge, replaced instead by the G Series.

Introduction and changes
The FG series Falcon was first previewed at a press event on 17 February 2008 and sold until October 2014.

Range change
To make a fresh start, Ford Australia decided to revolutionize the designation of all models within the range. In particular, the long-standing Futura, Fairmont, and Fairmont Ghia models were replaced by the more contemporary G6 and G6 E models, respectively. The FG moniker references the now discontinued Fairmont Ghia.
The FG was superseded in December 2014, by the FG X series.

Powertrains
From July 2010 all I6 engines (excluding E-Gas models) meet Euro 4 emission standards. The ZF six-speed auto is an optional extra, the XR6 series having a five-speed as standard.

In 2011, Ford introduced a new LPG system to the Falcon, marketed as "EcoLPI" the system features liquid injection as opposed to the vapour set up used in the previous E-Gas system. The new injection set up is accompanied by new light weight pistons and rings, a higher compression ratio of 12.0:1 and other modifications that improve power and economy. These figures virtually match the petrol version for power and torque when running on 95 octane fuel. In addition to the engine improvements, the new LPG system now features a 6-speed automatic as standard. The new system was available from July 2011 and was an option on models fitted with the naturally aspirated 6-cylinder engine.

Ford introduced the 2.0L Ecoboost engine in 2012 which will reputedly use 20 percent less fuel and emit significantly less CO2 emissions than the current 4.0L engine. The Falcon will be the first rear drive application using the Ecoboost engine, however, not capable of matching  of torque available at as low as 1500 rpm on the 4.0L petrol version.

Safety
The FG range achieved an ANCAP five star safety rating, being the first Australian manufactured car to do so, achieving a score of 34.6 out of 37.

Model range
The Ford FG Falcon comprised 7 different trim levels, divided into 3 three distinct groups:
 the base Falcon
 the luxury G6 series
 the sports Falcon XR.

The specific models included the Falcon XT, the luxury G6, G6E, G6E Turbo, and the sports XR6, XR6 Turbo and XR8. The ute variants included the base Falcon Ute, R6, XR6, XR6 Turbo and XR8.

Falcon XT
The XT is the base model of the FG Falcon range. The XT has a business class suspension tune: the rear suspension is Ford's Control Blade IRS, and the front suspension is virtual pivot link, the same architecture as found in the Territory. The brakes are carried over from the BF Falcon.

The naturally aspirated XT engine specification is identical to the non-turbo XR6, G6, G6E and Utility vehicle variants powered by the 4.0L engine. At launch, the standard transmission was a new 5-speed auto, replacing the previous Australian designed and made 4-speed. The ZF 6-speed auto was optional from the launch in 2008. In July 2010, the 6-speed was made standard. Both the 5- and the 6- speed retain the 2.73:1 final open differential ratio with LSD optional on XR6 models.

The new styling is based around the kinetic design Ford Europe uses for their cars. The interior has been improved from the previous model. The centre console has been lifted to make for a more luxurious and spacious feeling. The interior is more roomy and has better entry and exit for front and rear passengers. The XT is now better equipped, it has a MP3 compatible CD player,  auxiliary audio input jack, single zone automatic climate control, cruise control, 60/40 split fold-down rear seat back, front and rear power windows, four airbags, Dynamic Stability Control (DSC) with Emergency Brake Assist and a driver fatigue warning system. From 1 September 2008, all XT models have been specified with alloy wheels as standard equipment, previously an extra-cost option. This replaced the 16" x 6.5" steel wheels that used plastic wheel covers or center hub caps.

Falcon XR6
The base model in the XR range, which features the same 4.0L I6 engine found in the XT, G6 and G6E. It has the same features as the XT, plus a 6-Speed manual transmission, 17 x 8-inch 5-spoke alloy wheels; optional 18- and 19-inch are available, Sports Control Blade Independent Rear Suspension (IRS), Sports body kit with side skirts and rear bumper, rear spoiler, front fog lamps, leather-wrapped steering wheel with mounted audio controls, alloy pedal covers and cloth sports seats. It can also be had with an automatic transmission, with a choice of 5 or 6-speed. Both having slightly quicker acceleration than the manual variant. As of July 2010, the 5-speed automatic is no longer available.

Falcon XR6 Turbo
The Turbo model of the XR6 comes with all of the features of the standard XR6 plus 18 x 8-inch five-spoke alloy wheels, limited slip differential, and upgraded front brakes (322mm rotors instead of the standard 298mm) without an option for 328mm x 26mm ventilated rear discs as found on BF Mk1 XR6T and XR8 models, losing on the braking capacity overall with 303mmx16mm solid rear discs, the same hardware found on the original BA XT from 2002. It uses the same 4.0L I6 Turbo engine that is found in the G6E Turbo. The six-speed automatic transmission used in turbocharged models is the 6HP26 which is rated to handle more torque than the 6HP21'' used in non-turbo models. Performance wise, it is considered the fastest model in the FG Falcon range capable of 0–100 km/h (0-62 mph) in 4.8s, excluding the Falcon-based FPV models from Ford Australia's performance vehicle partner Ford Performance Vehicles. The I6 engine also has the ability to provide the driver with an "over-boost" feature which engages temporarily when the throttle is fully depressed at speed & correct atmospheric measures are met. Once correct condition's have been met, the engine will provide an increase in boost pressure of up to 12psi from a standard maximum of 10psi; which allows for power around the  mark.

Both the XR6 and XR6 Turbo can be optioned with the "XR Luxury Pack", which adds sports leather seats and black carbon look trim inserts, dual zone climate control, 19x8 inch alloy wheels, and premium sound. The "Tech pack" is also available and adds Bluetooth and iPod integration; both option packs add almost all the features from the G6E (minus reversing camera, curtain and side thorax airbags, an 8-way power adjustable driver's seat and memory mirrors, overhead sunglasses holder and mirror indicators)

Falcon XR8
The XR8 had the same features that are found in the XR6 Turbo. The bulging hood and supporting emblems on the side skirts differentiated it from other XR models. It was also subjectively less agile through corners due to a significantly heavier front end. Although slightly slower in some cases, less economical and more expensive than its XR6 Turbo counterpart, it was and still is considered more popular amongst the more traditional Falcon enthusiasts who prefer the sound, feel and vibe of a naturally aspirated V8 over the inline 6 Turbo, for its sound, off the line performance and overall wider performance envelope vs the Barra 270. However, the XR8 sold poorly compared to the XR6 Turbo with the majority of volume being in utility sales.

The Falcon XR8 was discontinued in June 2010 as a result of its 5.4-litre engine not complying with the Euro IV emissions standard adopted by Australia at that time. Although initially expected to be re-introduced with the 5.0-litre "Coyote" engine used in the Ford Mustang GT during 2011, the model was re-introduced in 2014 with the FG-X series Falcon, featuring the 5.0 litre motor.

G Series

Up from the XT, this is the base model in the G Series. The G6 is the direct replacement for the Futura. It is powered by the same 4.0L engine and was originally mated to the five-speed automatic (upgraded to the ZF six-speed automatic in 2010). Besides the suspension, which is the sport-luxury tune found in the G6E, the drivetrain of the car is the same as the XT. Equipment levels are increased in the G6. It comes with front fog lights, a leather-wrapped steering wheel with mounted audio controls, rear parking sensors, sports body kit with side skirts and rear bumper, 17-inch alloy wheels.

A G6 Limited Edition consisting of just 1500 units, based on the G6. It's unknown how many of these 1500 units were Ecoboost. The G6 Limited Edition added leather seats in Shadow, Bluetooth, iPod integration, sports leather-wrapped steering wheel, unique fog lamp bezels, unique front grill (upper and lower), a unique rear bumper insert, side curtain airbags and 18-inch alloy wheels (17-inch on the E-Gas model).

The G6E is a step up from the G6, it is the replacement for the old Fairmont Ghia. It includes all of the features of the G6, plus a ZF six-speed automatic transmission, dual zone automatic climate control, a premium audio system, leather seats, Bluetooth mobile phone integration, reversing camera, curtain and side thorax airbags, an 8-way power adjustable driver's seat, 17 x 8-inch 10-spoke alloy wheels, front scuff plates and an overhead sunglass console. It also features Mercedes-Benz styled side indicators on the side mirrors, similar to that on premium European cars.

GPS-equipped Ford Falcons (Ford G Series) can warn of traffic incidents via TMC.

The G6E Turbo is the same as the G6E, except it has an I6 turbocharged engine, 18 x 8-inch 7-spoke alloy wheels, lower suspension, piano black centre console rather than silver, iPod integration, turbo decals and a boot mounted spoiler. The engine is the same as that found in the XR6 Turbo.

From April 2009 production, an update was introduced. This involved an improvement in fuel consumption on six-cylinder models fitted with the optional six-speed automatic. It was also announced that the LPG E-Gas models, like the petrol-powered versions of the FG sedan range, had been awarded the full five-stars in the ANCAP crash safety test. The five-star rating, up from four, was not due to any structural changes to the FG, but by the introduction of electronic stability control (ESC) which was previously only fitted to petrol-powered FG sedans. ESC was also made standard on the E-Gas BF III Falcon wagons still in production (previously unavailable). ESC fitment was extended to the utility body styles from May 2009, excluding the base XL and R6 Ute, where it was optional. From June 2010, all sedan models received Bluetooth mobile phone integration and iPod integration as standard equipment.

MkII
MkII, introduced in 2011, is the first major visual upgrade for the FG Falcon since its introduction in 2008. The MkII has a revised front fascia similar to that of the SZ Ford Territory, this includes a smaller upper grille and a larger octagonal lower grille, along with revised headlight and fog light assemblies, G6E and G6E turbo models come standard with LED running lights. All new specification levels (except XT and XL) get the new ICC (Interior Command Centre), the unit is an 8" touch screen with 2D and 3D maps, SUNA traffic updates overspeed and speed camera warnings, street house number display and is fully integrated.

Improved safety features on the MkII include six airbags (dual front, side and curtains) will be standard on all sedan models, the 'Generation 9.0' Dynamic Stability Control system is standard across the range and rear parking sensors are now standard.
The MkII was placed on sale in late 2011, with a turbocharged four-cylinder EcoBoost engine option becoming available in early 2012.

FPV range

As with the previous Falcon BA and BF series, Ford Performance Vehicles (FPV) produced high-performance versions of the Falcon FG. They included the F6 and V8-powered GT, GT-P and the GT E variants of the sedan the F6 Ute and V8-powered Pursuit and Super Pursuit models based on the Falcon Ute. As of October 2009, FPV released a luxury F6-E model variant, which was equipped the same as a GT E but with an F6 engine. Also in October 2009, FPV released a GS model to commemorate the historic GS nameplate from the 1970s, which was sold in lieu of a Falcon XR8. It was limited to 250 sedans and 75 utes, and was powered by a detuned V8 from the GT. Its distinguishing exterior features included unique "GS" decals and dark argent wheels.

In October 2010, FPV introduced a supercharged all-alloy DOHC 4 valves per cylinder Coyote "Miami"  V8 engine to replace the older 5.4 L Boss unit. A  version was introduced in the FPV GS model (which replaces the defunct XR8 model) and a  version was developed for the FPV GT, GT E, and GT-P models.

Limited editions in this series included the 5th Anniversary,  GT "Black", GT "R-Spec" and, most importantly, the GT F "351". Furthermore, the dyno testing shows that this engine makes significantly more power than the quoted 315, 335, 345 and 351 kW, figures in excess of 380-400 kW (510-535 hp) at the rear wheels or ~ 450-470 kW (600-630 hp) at the flywheel. They also introduced launch control and the "351" nomenclature of the GT F, which has become the "F"inal GT Falcon ever, represents both its engine output but also pays tribute to the original Falcon GT's cubic inch displacement.

See also 

Ford Falcon (Australia)
Ford Performance Vehicles

References

External links

FG Falcon
FG Falcon
Cars introduced in 2008
Cars of Australia
Full-size vehicles
Coupé utilities
Police vehicles
Rear-wheel-drive vehicles
Sedans
2010s cars